Xilitla is a municipality and town in the state of San Luis Potosí in the Huasteca region of Mexico.

Xilitla is known for its fertile mountains and springs which create panoramic landscapes throughout the municipality. Las Pozas gardens are a major tourist attraction.

History and Economy

The rugged landscape has partly shielded Xilitla from industrialization, helping preserve its indigenous Huastec and Nahuatl cultures and traditional agrarian lifestyles.  Most of Xilitla's residents live in over 100 rural villages of several dozen up to several hundred people. About 30,000 people in Xilitla live in indigenous households and about 20,000 of them speak an indigenous language, principally Huastec.  Most of the speakers of an indigenous language also speak Spanish.

Augustine missionary activity in the Xilitla area began in 1537 and in 1553 construction began on the St. Augustine Convent.  It was built to serve both a religious building and a fortress as the Chichimeca war was in progress and one of the hostile Chichimeca tribes, the Pame, lived to the northwest.  The convent was attacked and burned by the Indians in 1569 and 1587 and largely abandoned by the Augustines. In the 17th century, the Dominicans made another attempt to evangelize but were unable to overcome the hostility of the Indians.  Finally, in the mid-18th century, Fray Junípero Serra and the Franciscans succeeded in establishing a permanent missionary presence in the region.

The economy is primarily agricultural with the main crops being coffee and citrus. A coffee fair is held in August. A local food specialty is the zacahuil, a giant tamale (3 to 4 feet long) wrapped in banana leaves and filled with pork on one side and chicken on the other.

Geography
La Silleta, a prominent thumb-shaped mountain, scalable only with mountain climbing gear, rises to  six miles west of the city. The land area in the municipality is largely steep but habitable slopes. To the south and west, Xilitla borders the mountains of Querétaro and Hidalgo states. To the northeast, Xilitla borders flat terrain along the Tancuilin river, and Mexican highway 85.

There are a number of caves and caverns in Xilitla, as well as many natural springs.  Parakeet Cave, a short walk from the town, is home to a large number of green parrots which leave and re-enter the cave at dawn and dusk every day. The land is largely sedimentary rock with striations visible on cliffs and roads.

Climate 

The climatic classification for Xilitla is a humid subtropical climate closely bordering a tropical monsoon climate (Köppen climate classification). Xilitla's altitude moderates the hot temperatures recorded in nearby areas at lower altitudes. Receiving more than 100 inches (2,500 mm) of precipitation annually, Xilitla is one of the wettest areas of Mexico. Rainfall occurs throughout the year, with maximum precipitation coming in summer, but winters are not as dry as in many other parts of Mexico.

Las Pozas

The natural beauty of Xilitla inspired eccentric English artist Edward James to create Las Pozas ("the Pools"), a garden in a subtropical rainforest just outside the town of Xilitla. James' objective was to create a "Garden of Eden" at Las Pozas. A foundation now owns and operates Las Pozas which is open to the public.
Edward James house, near the centre of Xilitla is known as El Castillo and is now a hotel.

Museo Leonora Carrington
A museum with sculptures of Leonora Carrington opened October 19, 2018.

Transportation

The highway to the southwest winds around tight curves through the mountains to Querétaro and Mexico City.  Heading northeast from town, the highway winds 10 km to La Y Griega, a large T-intersection into highway 85.  Ciudad Valles is 100 km north along 85, and Tamazunchale is 50 km south.  Buses run hourly from the town to Ciudad Valles and Tamazunchale and several times daily to Monterrey, Mexico City, San Luis Potosí and Tampico.  More frequent buses are available at Y Griega.

References

External links
Página Oficial, Xilitla Pueblo Mágico

 Topographic Map - shows Xilitla in lower-left section

Municipalities of San Luis Potosí
Geography of San Luis Potosí
Gardens in Mexico
Pueblos Mágicos